Thrills, Kills + Sunday Pills is the fourth studio album by Australian alternative rock band, Grinspoon. It was released on 20 September 2004 by record label, Universal Music, with Howard Benson producing. On the ARIA Albums Chart it peaked at No. 4; ARIA certified the album as platinum for shipment of 70,000 units.

At the ARIA Music Awards of 2005 it won Best Rock Album.

Four singles were issued: "Hard Act to Follow" (August 2004), "Better Off Alone" (November), "Hold on Me" (February 2005) and "Bleed You Dry" (June).

Background 

Grinspoon's fourth studio album, Thrills, Kills + Sunday Pills, marked another change in their musical direction – their third album, New Detention (June 2002), had been more commercial than their earlier work. The band's founding mainstays are Pat Davern on guitar, Joe Hansen on bass guitar, Kristian Hopes on drums and Phil Jamieson on lead vocals and guitar. They recorded the new album in Los Angeles with Howard Benson (Motorhead, Sepultura) producing.

Ed Nimmervoll of HowlSpace remarked that for the recording they had "deliberately put aside any song that sounded typical Grinspoon, Benson encouraged the band to keep things simple and concentrate on the songs in their own right. The result was the 'Poppy-est" album of [their] career. They knew that some of their hardcore fans would initially find the album difficult to accept."

Thrills, Kills + Sunday Pills was released on 20 September 2004 by record label Universal. Four singles were released from the album: "Hard Act to Follow" (August 2004), "Better Off Alone" (November), "Hold on Me" (February 2005) and Bleed You Dry (June). Grinspoon had started their tour in support of "Hard Act to Follow" on 26 August 2004 and continued to 4 September.

Reception 

Thrills, Kills + Sunday Pills peaked at No. 4 on the ARIA Albums Chart, and by December was certified platinum for shipment of 70,000 copies. The lead single, "Hard Act to Follow", reached No. 24 on the related ARIA Singles Chart, with "Better Off Alone" and "Hold on Me" both appearing in the top 50; the final single, "Bleed You Dry", peaked in the top 100. At the ARIA Music Awards of 2005 it won Best Rock Album and was nominated for Best Group.

As of 2008, the album has gained mostly positive reviews due to it containing the pop of New Detention while placing themselves in a more teen-oriented direction. Undercover's Tim Cashmere felt that "[it] ain't too shabby for your average everyday Grinspoon fan, but if you're not a Grinspoon fan by now, this album won't change your mind." He noted that Benson's contribution "didn't come through so much in the actual song writing or structure of the album, more in the great sounding guitars that he brought through in the band… something the band had been almost hitting, but never quite achieved until now."

Track listing

Personnel 

Grinspoon members
 Pat Davern – lead guitar
 Joe Hansen – bass guitar
 Kristian Hopes – drums
 Phil Jamieson – lead vocals, guitar

Additional musicians
 Paul DeCarli – keyboards
 Keith Nelson – guitar technician
 Jon Nicholson – drum technician

Production
 Howard Benson – producer
 Paul DeCarli – editing, programming
 Eric Miller – assistant engineer
 Mike Plotnikoff – recording, mixing
 Steve Smart – mastering

Art work
 Michael Spiccia – design, art direction
 Yvonne Armstrong, Uri Auerbach, Simon Upton – photography

Charts

Weekly charts

Year-end charts

Certifications

References 

2004 albums
ARIA Award-winning albums
Grinspoon albums
Albums produced by Howard Benson